La Contemplation du mystère is a Canadian drama film, directed by Albéric Aurtenèche and released in 2021. The film stars Emmanuel Schwartz as Éloi, a man who is returning to his small hometown in Quebec to partake in a group ritual commemorating his father's death in a hunting accident a year earlier, only to end up using psychedelic drugs such as DMT and ayahuasca in his quest to understand the event's meaning in his life.

The film's cast also includes Gilles Renaud, Martin Dubreuil, François Papineau and Sarah-Jeanne Labrosse.

Production on the film started in October 2019. The film was originally slated to premiere at the 2020 Festival du nouveau cinéma, but was withdrawn at that time and instead premiered at the 2021 festival on October 15, 2021. It opened commercially on October 22.

The film was a nominee for the DGC Discovery Award at the 2020 Directors Guild of Canada awards.

References

External links
 

2021 films
2021 drama films
Canadian drama films
Films shot in Quebec
Films set in Quebec
French-language Canadian films
2020s Canadian films